Louis Hyacinthe Bouilhet (27 May 1821 – 18 July 1869) was a French poet and dramatist.

Bouilhet was born at Cany, Seine Inférieure. He was a schoolfellow of Gustave Flaubert, to whom he dedicated his first work, Miloenis (1851), a narrative poem in five cantos, dealing with Roman manners under the emperor Commodus. His volume of poems entitled Fossiles attracted considerable attention, on account of the attempt therein to use science as a subject for poetry. These poems were included also in Festons et astragales (1859).

As a dramatist he secured a success with his first play, Madame de Monlarcy (1856), which ran for seventy-eight nights at the Odéon; and Hélène Peyron (1858) and L'Oncle Million (1860) were also favorably received. But of his other plays, some of them of real merit, only the Conjuration d'Amboise (1866) met with any great success. Bouilhet died on 18 July 1869, at Rouen. Flaubert published his posthumous poems with a notice of the author, in 1872.

Bouilhet was Flaubert's mentor and guide, and Flaubert never wrote anything without his advice.  A few months after Bouilhet's death in 1869 Flaubert wrote: "When I lost my poor Bouilhet, I lost my midwife, the man who saw more clearly into my mind than I did myself."  Starkie quotes Maxime Du Camp who knew them both well as saying that "it was Bouilhet who was the master, in the matter of literature at least, and that it was Flaubert who obeyed."  Throughout their lives, Flaubert referred to Bouilhet as "Monseigneur."

See also
 List of works by Eugène Guillaume

References

 Maxime Du Camp, Souvenirs littéraires (1882)
 H. de la Ville de Mirmont, Le Poète Louis Bouilhet (1888)
 Enid Starkie, "Flaubert: The Making of the Master" (1967)
 Enid Starkie, "Flaubert the Master" (1971)

19th-century French poets
19th-century French dramatists and playwrights
People from Seine-Maritime
1821 births
1869 deaths
French male poets
19th-century French male writers